Jemma Reekie (born 6 March 1998) is a Scottish middle-distance runner. She placed fourth in the 800 metres at the 2020 Tokyo Olympics, narrowly missing out on the bronze medal. Reekie achieved a rare double at the 2019 European U23 Championships, winning both the 800m and 1500 metres events.

At age 19, she took the 1500m title at the 2017 European under-20 Championships, when she also finished fourth in the 3000 metres. Reekie is the British record holder for the indoor mile. She won two British titles, and four titles at junior level.

Career
In February 2020, Reekie broke three British indoor records within eight days, setting new mark for the 800 metres, and then for the mile and 1500 metres along the way. The 1500m record was taken back by her Scottish training partner, Laura Muir, in 2021. The 800m record was bettered by Keely Hodgkinson in 2022.

In September 2021, she won the Fifth Avenue Mile in New York. It was a Scottish sweep as Jake Wightman took victory in the men's race.

Achievements

International competitions

Circuit wins
 Diamond League
 2020 (2): Stockholm Bauhaus-galan (800 m), Rome Golden Gala (800 m)
 World Indoor Tour
 2020 (2): Glasgow Indoor Grand Prix (1500 m), Liévin Meeting International (800 m)

Personal bests
800 metres – 1:56.90 (Tokyo 2021)
 800 metres indoor – 1:57.91 (Glasgow 2020) (the then-fastest world mark since 2006)
 1000 metres – 2:31.11 (Monaco 2020)
 1500 metres – 4:02.09 (London 2019)
 1500 metres indoor – 4:00.52 (New York 2020)
 One mile – 4:27.00 (Birmingham 2019)
 One mile indoor – 4:17.88 (New York 2020) 
 3000 metres – 9:24.81 (Grosseto 2017; also in mixed races: 9:11.20 Manchester 2017)
 3000 metres indoor – 9:16.48 (Glasgow 2019)

Awards
 Scottish Athletics
 Performer of the Year: 2020 (with Laura Muir and Jake Wightman)
 British Athletics Writers' Association
 Cliff Temple Award for British Female Athlete of the Year: 2020

Gallery

References

External links

 

1998 births
Living people
Scottish female middle-distance runners
British female middle-distance runners
Athletes (track and field) at the 2020 Summer Olympics
Olympic athletes of Great Britain